Sans Souci Girls' High School is a Public English medium high school for girls situated in the suburb of Newlands in Cape Town in the Western Cape province of South Africa. The school was established in 1960 and was decreed by the apartheid era South African government as whites only school. In 1991 the school opened enrollment to all races as a model B school.

One of the school's former teacher’s Denise Frick, is a South African chess master and winner of the 2015 South African Woman's Closed Chess Championships.

History

Sport 
Sans Souci Girls' High School has been performing very well on sports during the year.

 Archery
 Athletics
 Chess 
 Cricket 
 Cross country
 Cycling 
 Diving
 Equestrian
 Hockey
 Netball
 Rowing
 Squash
 Swimming 
 Table tennis
 Tennis 
 Water polo

Controversy 
In 2016 the school's hair and language policies caused controversy resulting in a broader national discussion of exclusionary or discriminatory school policies and an investigation by the Western Cape Education Department.

In 2019 controversy hit the school again when a teacher was filmed slapping a student. The incident resulted in an Equity Court case against the teacher that was ultimately withdrawn.

References

External links

External links
South African College Schools Website
SACS Junior School
SACS Rugby Site

Schools in Cape Town
Educational institutions established in 1960
Girls' schools in South Africa
1960 establishments in South Africa
Newlands, Cape Town